Human spaceflights were vital to the operation of Mir, allowing crews and equipment to be carried to and from the space station. Mir was visited by a total of 39 crewed missions, comprising 30 Soyuz flights (1 Soyuz-T, 29 Soyuz-TM) and 9 Space Shuttle flights. These missions carried both long-duration crew members flying principal expeditions (ranging from 70 days up to Valeri Polyakov's 14-month stay beginning in January 1994, which still holds the record for the longest continuous spaceflight by a single person) and short-term visitors (who spent about a week aboard the station). Many of the crew who visited Mir used different spacecraft to launch than they did to land; the first such examples were Aleksandr Viktorenko and Muhammed Faris who flew up in Soyuz TM-3 (launched 22 July 1987) and landed a week later in Soyuz TM-2 on 30 July 1987. The largest crew aboard Mir simultaneously (not including Shuttle-Mir missions) was 6, which first occurred with the launch of Soyuz TM-7 on 26 November 1988 and lasted for just over three weeks.

In this list, uncrewed visiting spacecraft are excluded (see List of uncrewed spaceflights to Mir for details), and long-duration crew members are listed in bold. Times are given in Coordinated Universal Time (UTC). "Time docked" refers to the spacecraft and does not necessarily correspond to the crew.

See also 
List of human spaceflights to the International Space Station
List of Mir expeditions
List of Mir spacewalks
List of Mir visitors
List of Progress flights
List of uncrewed spaceflights to Mir
Uncrewed spaceflights to the International Space Station

References 

 Mir from www.astronautix.com - List of launches and EVA activity with links to detailed descriptions
 List of Mir expeditions from www.spacefacts.de

Mir, human spaceflights
Mir